Große Haube is a mountain of Bavaria, Germany. It is 658 metres above sea level. The mountain is part of a large, low mountain range located in Bavaria. The name "Große Haube" is German for "large hood".

Mountains of Bavaria
Mountains and hills of the Rhön